Orazio Torsellino (1545–1599), known in Latin as Horatius Torsellinus, was an Italian historian and man of letters. He wrote books on Christianity, world history, and Latin grammar.

He was born in Rome and joined the Jesuit order. He was later assigned to Florence and Loreto, before returning to Rome. Among his writings were:
De vita San Francisci Xaverii libri VI (Rome, 1596, in quarto)
 Note: refers to St St Francis Xavier.
De particulis Latinae orationis (1598, 12mo)
Epitome historiarum a mundo condito ad ann. 1598 (Rome, in quarto)
which continued under the editors PC Caraffa and Filippo Briet. The work in 1761 was decreed to be prohibited by the inquisition.

His Universal History volumes are divided into chapters mainly about emperors from history. For example, Volume III, in order, has chapters about the Holy Roman Emperors (or disputed pretenders): Henry II, Conrad II, Henry III, Henry IV, Henry V, Lothario II, Conrad III, Frederick Barbarossa, Henry VI, Othon IV, Frederick II, Rudolph of Hapsburg, Adolph of Nassau, Albert of Austria, Henry VII of Luxembourg, Louis of Bavaria, Charles IV of Luxembourg, Wenceslaus of Luxembourg, Rupert of Bavaria, Sigismund of Luxembourg, Albert II of Austria, Frederick III, Maximilian I, and Charles V of Austria.

References

Sowerby, E.M. Catalogue of the Library of Thomas Jefferson, 1952, v. 1, p. 22

External links
Orazio Torsellini in the Historical Archives of the Pontifical Gregorian University

1545 births
1599 deaths
Italian Renaissance humanists
Jesuit historiography